Grigorii Mikhailovich Fichtenholz (or Fikhtengolts) (June 8, 1888 in Odessa – June 26, 1959 in Leningrad) was a Soviet mathematician working on real analysis and functional analysis.  Fichtenholz was one of the founders of the Leningrad school of real analysis.

He also authored a three-volume textbook 'Differential and Integral Calculus'. The books cover mathematical analysis of function of one real variable, functions of many real variables and of complex functions. Due to depth and precision of presentation of material, these books are defined as classical position in mathematical analysis. Book was translated, among others, into German, Polish, Chinese, Vietnamese, and Persian however translation to English language has not been done still.

Fichtenholz's books about analysis are widely used in Middle and Eastern European as well as Chinese universities due to its exceptionality of detailed and well-ordered presentation of material about mathematical analysis. Due to unknown reasons, these books do not have the same fame in universities in other areas of the world.

He was an Invited Speaker of the ICM in 1924 in Toronto.

Leonid Kantorovich and Isidor Natanson were among his students.

References

External links

Grigorii Mikhailovich Fichtenholz

Soviet mathematicians
Mathematical analysts
1888 births
1959 deaths